Martina Orzan (born 6 September 1971) is an Italian rower. She competed in the women's lightweight double sculls event at the 1996 Summer Olympics.

References

1971 births
Living people
Italian female rowers
Olympic rowers of Italy
Rowers at the 1996 Summer Olympics
Sportspeople from Trieste